A , sometimes referred to as a heavy motorcycle, is one of the vehicle categories in the Road Traffic Act of Japan. Such vehicles (motorcycles) have a displacement of over 400 cc or a rated output of more than 20 kW.

Other categories include a small two-wheel motor vehicle (small motorcycle) and a standard two-wheel motor vehicle (ordinary motorcycle).

Heavy motorcycle license

A license to ride a heavy motorcycle can be obtained from the age of 18 onward. An AT license allows the rider to ride only AT motorcycles. Conversely, with a manual license, the rider is able to ride both AT and manual motorcycles. Riding a heavy motorcycle on a public road with an ordinary motorcycle license will result in the violation of "unlicensed driving".

License category history
A heavy motorcycle license and ordinary motorcycle license have been independent license categories since 1996. 

In June 2005, it became possible to ride an AT (automatic transmission) motorcycle over 400 cc if the AT license for a heavy motorcycle was acquired.

In December 2019, the upper limit of the displacement of a heavy AT motorcycle that can be operated with a heavy AT motorcycle license became unlimited. This applied not only to those who would newly obtain a license after December 2019, but also to those who had an existing AT heavy motorcycle license. Furthermore, from the same day, motorcycles that use power sources other than internal combustion engines, such as electric motors, have also been classified as heavy motorcycles when the rated output exceeds 20 kW.

History of the 750 cc distinction
In the past, heavy motorcycles were referred to in Japan as
 (literally, seven and a half) since they generally had no more than a 750 cc engine. This is because when the Honda CB750FOUR went on the market, its maximum speed exceeded  and the National Police Agency (worried about excessive speed) requested motorcycle manufacturers to set up a voluntary regulation to limit the displacement of motorcycles that could be sold in Japan to 750 cc.

For that reason, Kawasaki motorcycles developed the Z2 in which the displacement of the Z1 had been suppressed to 750 cc, and each motorcycle company saw cases where the chassis of their export vehicles were fitted with a 750 cc engine until the mid-1980s 

Since the self-regulation was abolished in 1988, many so-called "liter machine" models with engine displacements exceeding 1,000 cc have been released. Carried over from past days, fees for shipping motorcycles on ferries in Japan still vary depending on whether the vehicle's displacement exceeds 750 cc or not.

Categories
Some of the vehicle categories under Japanese law are as follows:

Other details

Applicability in other countries
Great Britain has an exchange agreement with Japan (and with 16 other countries/regions) which allows the holder of a Japanese heavy motorcycle license who is deemed to be resident in the UK to exchange it for an equivalent British license (Category A). To do this, the holder must send the license, a translation thereof, an application form and a fee to the DVLA or DVA (for Northern Ireland).

Gallery

See also
 Bōsōzoku

References

External links
 Statistics about acquiring a Shipping (Shipping by Motorcycle Enthusiasts)
  Information about acquiring a license (Japan Motorcycle Promotion & Safety Association)

Road transport in Japan
Japan